Ian Coldwater is an American computer security specialist, hacker and speaker specializing in Kubernetes and cloud native security. They are a security architect at Twilio, and co-chair the Kubernetes special interest group Kubernetes SIG Security.

Career 
Coldwater started working in tech in their thirties, starting in DevOps before focusing on security. They began specializing in hacking and hardening Kubernetes containers, working as an independent penetration tester before joining Heroku as a lead platform security engineer. As of 2021, they work as a security architect at Twilio. Along with Tabitha Sable, they co-chair the Kubernetes special interest group, Kubernetes SIG Security. They are also on the governing board of the Open Source Security Foundation. 

Coldwater has spoken at conferences including DEF CON, Black Hat, KubeCon and CloudNativeCon, RSA Conference, Velocity, and devopsdays. In 2020, they received the Top Ambassador award from the Cloud Native Computing Foundation for spreading interest in the area.

Hacking Kubernetes, published by O'Reilly Media, credits Coldwater and Duffie Cooley for co-developing the "canonical offensive Kubernetes one-liner". In 2020, Coldwater and Brad Geesaman presented a talk at RSA 2020 titled "Advanced Persistence Threats – The Future of Kubernetes Attacks", in which they demonstrated bypassing Kubernetes audit logs and other attacks. In 2021, Coldwater, with expertise from Chad Rikansrud, became the first person in history to escape a container on a mainframe.

Personal life 
Coldwater lives in Minneapolis, Minnesota. Politically, they identify as an anarchist.

See also 

 Kelsey Hightower

References

External links 
 

21st-century American people
American computer scientists
American software engineers
Computer security specialists
Living people
Non-binary computer scientists
Open source people
People from Minneapolis
Year of birth missing (living people)
InfoSec Twitter
Anarchists
American anarchists